The following lists events that happened during 2014 in Rwanda.

Incumbents 
 President: Paul Kagame 
 Prime Minister: Pierre Habumuremyi (until 24 July), Anastase Murekezi (starting 24 July)

Events

March
 March 7 - Rwanda and South Africa each expel the other's diplomats after armed men broke into an exiled Rwandan critic's home in Johannesburg.
 March 14 - A French court sentences former Rwandan army captain Pascal Simbikangwa to 25 years for his role in the 1994 Rwandan genocide.

Sport

August
 August 17 - Rwandan international footballer Daddy Birori is found to be a Congolese player using a fraudulent passport. Rwanda is disqualified from the 2015 Africa Cup of Nations qualification competition as a result.

References

 
2010s in Rwanda
Years of the 21st century in Rwanda
Rwanda
Rwanda